In algebraic geometry, a toroidal embedding is an open embedding of algebraic varieties that locally looks like the embedding of the open torus into a toric variety. The notion was introduced by Mumford to prove the existence of semistable reductions of algebraic varieties over one-dimensional bases.

Definition 
Let X be a normal variety over an algebraically closed field  and  a smooth open subset. Then  is called a toroidal embedding if for every closed point x of X, there is an isomorphism of local -algebras:

Let X be a normal variety over a field k. An open embedding  is said to a toroidal embedding if  is a toroidal embedding.

Examples

Tits' buildings

See also 
tropical compactification

References 

Abramovich, D., Denef, J. & Karu, K.: Weak toroidalization over non-closed fields. manuscripta math. (2013) 142: 257.

External links 
Toroidal embedding

Algebraic geometry